A triolet is a poetic form that is eight lines long.

Triolet may also refer to:
 Triolet (crater), a crater on Mars
 Triolet, Mauritius, a village in the north of Mauritius
 Aiguille de Triolet, a mountain in the Alps
 a variant of Scrabble

People with the surname
 Elsa Triolet (1896-1970), French writer

See also
 The Triolettes, a 1930s American band